Guo Jianli (born 6 March 1988) is a Chinese modern pentathlete who won individual and team gold medals at the 2014 Asian Games. He finished 11th at the 2016 Olympics.

References

1988 births
Living people
Modern pentathletes at the 2016 Summer Olympics
Olympic modern pentathletes of China
Chinese male modern pentathletes
Asian Games gold medalists for China
Medalists at the 2014 Asian Games
Asian Games medalists in modern pentathlon
Modern pentathletes at the 2014 Asian Games
20th-century Chinese people
21st-century Chinese people